Eupithecia primitiva is a moth in the family Geometridae. It is found in western China (Gansu).

The wingspan is about 18 mm. The forewings are pale brown and the hindwings are dirty white.

References

Moths described in 2004
primitiva
Moths of Asia